Pultenaea williamsoniana, commonly known as Williamson's bush-pea, is a species of flowering plant in the family Fabaceae and is endemic to a restricted area of Victoria, Australia. It is a slender, erect shrub with its stems covered with white hairs, and has cylindrical, grooved leaves and yellow to orange and red, pea-like flowers arranged in clusters on the ends of short side branches.

Description

Taxonomy and naming
Pultenaea williamsoniana was first formally described in 1967 James Hamlyn Willis in the journal Muelleria from specimens he collected on Mount Zero in October 1927. The specific epithet (williamsoniana) honours Herbert Bennett Williamson.

Distribution and habitat
Williamson's bush-pea grows on rocky slopes in heathy understorey in the northern Grampians.

Conservation status
This peas is listed as "vulnerable" under the Australian Government Environment Protection and Biodiversity Conservation Act 1999 and the Victorian Government Flora and Fauna Guarantee Act 1988. A National Recovery Plan has been prepared. The main threats to the species include inappropriate fire regimes, visitor pressure and road works.

References

williamsoniana
Flora of Victoria (Australia)
Plants described in 1967
Taxa named by James Hamlyn Willis